Andriy Volodymyrovych Rudenko (born 4 September 1983) is a Ukrainian professional boxer.

Professional boxing record

References

External links 
 

1983 births
Living people
Ukrainian male boxers
Heavyweight boxers
Sportspeople from Dnipro